Pastel QAnon is a collection of techniques and strategies that use "soft" and feminine aesthetics – most notably pastel colors – that are used to attract women into the QAnon conspiracy theory, often using mainstream social media sites like Instagram, Facebook, Telegram and YouTube. 

Pastel QAnon social media influencers focus on aspects of the theory that tend to appeal to maternal instincts, such as the prevention of child sexual abuse and child sex trafficking, and use emotive and personable language. They are popular among wellness, yoga and New Age influencers. The term was coined by Marc-André Argentino, a researcher at Concordia University, Canada.

Background 

QAnon is an ongoing, American far-right, political conspiracy theory and mass political movement centering around false claims made by an anonymous individual or individuals known as "Q" that a cabal of Satanic, cannibalistic sexual abusers of children operate a global child sex trafficking ring that conspired against the former U.S. President Donald Trump during his term in office.

Although QAnon arose from mostly male-dominated online groups, women were and still represent a key demographic of QAnon supporters. According to political scientist Lorna Bracewell, right-wing movements that focus on child protection, such as QAnon, "speak to a distinctively feminine set of anxieties and fears to mobilize a distinctively feminine species of anger". Bracewell noted a similarity to the Tea Party movement, which attracted both local and national female leaders – most notably vice presidential nominee Sarah Palin. The QAnon movement appeals to the maternal notion of guardianship; for example, "mama grizzlies" who protect their children.

Groups targeted 

According to BuzzFeed News, lifestyle influencers began to spread pastel QAnon-related messages on Instagram as early as April 2020, largely using content relating to the COVID-19 pandemic, but were also one of the primary sources of misinformation. Pastel QAnon targets several existing communities and movements that are aimed at women.

The messages appealed to white, Republican-voting women, particularly suburban "soccer moms". This community is sometimes referred to as "QAmoms", a term followers use to refer to themselves. It has been associated with multilevel marketing groups, the wellness industry, and social media influencers, as well as a commercialisation of the QAnon movement in general, operating "within the concept of spectacle". 

Many wellness and New Age groups mistrust mainstream institutions, authority, and pharmaceutical companies, and as such are susceptible to QAnon beliefs. Researchers have identified scandals in the food industry, concerns over additives in food and genetically modified organisms (GMOs), conflicting scientific advice on child-rearing and the U.S. opioid epidemic – all of which disproportionately affect women – a lack of investment in women's health and general gender discrimination in medicine as key drivers for some women to reject mainstream science in favour of conspirituality – conspiratorial thinking combined with New Age spirituality – and QAnon beliefs, particularly anti-vaccine conspiracies or rhetoric.

QAnon believers facilitated this popularisation by moving from encrypted pages and anonymous message boards to mainstream websites such as Facebook and Instagram. The negative impact of the COVID-19 pandemic on many businesses led leaders to contact social media influencers or use viral marketing to promote their services.

Content

Gateway messaging 
Pastel QAnon uses existing social media messages about child protection, child trafficking, health and other topics as a gateway into the movement, and frames them using familiar, inspirational language. This is often done in an anecdotal, informal style. The messages do not always identify themselves as being related to QAnon and posters often deny any knowledge of QAnon but spread the same conspiracy theories in ways that are framed for a female audience, such as #SavetheChildren campaigns, which purport to be about child sex-trafficking but contain other QAnon-related content.

Gateway messaging is also done to avoid the deletion of posts; explicit QAnon references are banned on many social media sites. The movement also uses private groups, and the technique of posting and then auto-deleting stories on Instagram to promote their claims, giving conspiracy spreaders semi-plausible deniability. People and groups pushing pastel QAnon messages often deny any knowledge of QAnon. The messages tend to use and expand upon the targeted groups' existing distrust and misunderstanding, positive reinforcement, and fears for children's safety and security that became heightened during the COVID-19 pandemic.

Aesthetics 
Pastel QAnon uses feminine aesthetics, a pastel color palette, inspirational imagery, cute fonts, design language and phrases that are commonly used to market products and services aimed at women. This aesthetic includes glitter; diluted colors; handwriting fonts; illustrations and photographs of natural scenery, fashion, make up and aspirational lifestyles; and language such as spiritual and motivational quotations; in styles with which the targeted groups are familiar to make them attractive.

Becca Lewis, Stanford University researcher of online political subcultures, said:

See also

Aestheticization of politics
Gender advertisement
Gender differences in social network service use
Priming (media)
Purplewashing

References

Bibliography 

 

2020 hoaxes
Alt-right
Color in culture
Communication studies
Cults
Fake news
False allegations of sex crimes
Femininity
Fringe theories
Graphic design
Hoaxes in the United States
Internet manipulation and propaganda
Mass media and entertainment controversies
Persuasion techniques
Propaganda in the United States
Propaganda techniques
QAnon
Satanic ritual abuse hysteria in the United States
Semiotics
Vaccine hesitancy